Nogales High School is a high school in Nogales, Arizona under the jurisdiction of the Nogales Unified School District.

History

The old Nogales High School building from 1917 is listed on the National Register of Historic Places. It was designed by the firm of William Redding & Son. A centennial celebration for the school was held at it.

Academics
Nogales High School offers an Honors Curriculum that includes Advanced Placement (AP) courses, as well as the IB Diploma Programme.

Demographics
The demographic breakdown of the 1,714 students enrolled in 2013-14 was:
Male - 50.4%
Female - 49.6%
Native American/Alaskan - > 0.1%
Asian/Pacific islanders - 0.1%
Black - > 0.1%
Hispanic - 98.5%
White - 1.3%
Multiracial - 0%

Notable alumni
 Bob Baffert, Hall of Fame racehorse breeder and trainer, and two-time Triple Crown winner.
 Gil Heredia, former MLB player (San Francisco Giants, Montreal Expos, Texas Rangers, Oakland Athletics)
 Marco A. López Jr., former Chief of Staff, U.S. Customs and Border Protection; Senior Advisor to Janet Napolitano
 Jesus A. Osete, General Counsel to John R. Ashcroft, Secretary of State of Missouri; former Deputy Attorney General to Eric Schmitt, Attorney General of Missouri.

References

5. NHS grad moving up in legal world, Nogales International, Aug. 12, 2020, https://www.nogalesinternational.com/community/community-briefs-nhs-hall-of-fame-cancels-ceremony-still-raising-funds/article_243ad9d6-dccd-11ea-b540-b304616fecc3.html#tncms-source=infinity-scroll-summary-sticky-siderail-latest

Public high schools in Arizona
Schools in Santa Cruz County, Arizona
Nogales, Arizona
International Baccalaureate schools in Arizona